Alexander Blount Mahood (March 17, 1888 – December 25, 1970) was a Bluefield, West Virginia-based architect.

Life and career
Mahood was born in Lynchburg, Virginia in 1888. He attended public schools, after which he attended the École des Beaux-Arts in Paris and studied in the ateliers of Mssrs. Chifflot and Duquesne. After his return from France in 1911, he took a position as draftsman in the Lynchburg firm of Frye & Chesterman. He soon made his way to Roanoke, where he also worked for Henry H. Huggins and Homer M. Miller. In 1912 Miller elevated Mahood to a partner, in Miller & Mahood. Miller had, in 1911, landed a major commission in nearby Bluefield, the Law & Commerce Building - the largest office building in the growing city. Mahood was sent to Bluefield to open a branch office, where he would supervise construction and court new business.

Upon its completion in 1913, the Mahood offices were moved into the new Law & Commerce Building. The partnership with Miller was dissolved in 1914, and Mahood remained in Bluefield. He remained in private practice until 1923, when he established a partnership with Frederick C. Van Dusen, which lasted until 1926. He was again alone until 1940, when he added Richard T. Snellings of Charlottesville as an associate. His son, A. B. Mahood, Jr.  was also made an associate, in 1949. The firm would remain as such until 1970, when Mahood died.

Legacy
Mahood was the architect for the West Virginia Hotel (1923) and many of his major residential works are in the South Bluefield area.  These included the Country Club and the Country Club Hill section where the Bluefield Club was constructed in 1920.  Mahood designed mansions for magnates of the southern coalfields, and embellished Bluefield's residential districts with some of the grandest Georgian Revival houses in the state.

He designed the Women's Dormitory at the West Virginia University in Morgantown, United States Steel Building in Gary, Skyway Drive-In Theater in Brush Fork, the Deco-Style Mercer County Courthouse (1930–1931) in Princeton and the Guyan Theater in Logan.  He also designed a number of coal company offices and stores in the southern West Virginia region.  He may have also designed the McNeer House (1919) near Salt Sulphur Springs, West Virginia.

He died in 1970, at Bluefield, West Virginia.

Selected works

Miller & Mahood, 1912-1914
 1912 - Masonic Temple, 203 Federal St, Bluefield, West Virginia
 Demolished.

Alex. B. Mahood, 1914-1923
 1914 - Page Coal and Coke Company Store, Pageton St, Pageton, West Virginia
 Listed on the National Register of Historic Places in 1992.
 1915 - R. M. Garrett House, 109 Spring Grove Ave, Bluefield, West Virginia
 1915 - Alex B. Mahood House, 2306 Bland Rd, Bluefield, West Virginia
 The architect's own residence.
 1916 - The Baldwin House for W.G. Baldwin 126 Summers Street. (Mahood Papers, Eastern Regional Coal Archives)
 1916 - D. H. Barger House, 2009 Bland Rd, Bluefield, West Virginia
 1917 - Pocahontas Fuel Company Store, Powerhouse Hill Rd, Switchback, West Virginia
 Listed on the National Register of Historic Places in 1992.
 1917 - Pocahontas Fuel Company Store, Jenkinjones Mountain Rd, Jenkinjones, West Virginia
 Listed on the National Register of Historic Places in 1992.
 1918 - Wyoming Hotel, 1st St, Mullens, West Virginia
 1919 - Frank S. Easley House, 1500 College Ave, Bluefield, West Virginia
 Listed on the National Register of Historic Places in 1992.
 1919 - D. E. French House, 200 Duhring St, Bluefield, West Virginia
 1919 - Glen Alum Coal Company Store, Glen Alum, West Virginia
 Demolished.
 1919 - Lewis C. McNeer House, 22317 Seneca Trail S, Salt Sulphur Springs, West Virginia
 Attributed to Mahood.
 1919 - Ross House, 1917 Jefferson St, Bluefield, West Virginia
 1920 - Bluefield Elks Country Club, 1501 Whitethorn St, Bluefield, West Virginia
 1920 - Christ Episcopal Church, 200 Duhring St, Bluefield, West Virginia
 1920 - First Presbyterian Church, 151 Virginia Ave, Welch, West Virginia
 1920 - Henry Hotel, 50 E Church St, Martinsville, Virginia
 1920 - McDowell County Memorial Building, Elkhorn St, Welch, West Virginia
 Burned.
 1920 - John Stewart Memorial M. E. Church, 102 Jones St, Bluefield, West Virginia
 1920 - L. G. Toney House, 2116 Reid Ave, Bluefield, West Virginia
 1921 - Peerless Coal Company Store, Vivian Bottom Rd, Vivian, West Virginia
 Listed on the National Register of Historic Places in 1992.
 1922 - Commercial Bank Building, 401 Federal St, Bluefield, West Virginia
 1922 - Arthur Kingdon House, 625 Mountain View Ave, Bluefield, West Virginia
 1923 - Merchants' and Miners' National Bank Building, 8 Wyoming St, Welch, West Virginia
 1923 - Itmann Company Store and Office, WV-10, Itmann, West Virginia
 Listed on the National Register of Historic Places in 1990.

Mahood & Van Dusen, 1923-1926
 1923 - West Virginian Hotel, 415 Federal St, Bluefield, West Virginia
 1924 - W. A. Bodell House, 1430 Whitehorn St, Bluefield, West Virginia
 1924 - Leonard House, 2002 Jefferson St, Bluefield, West Virginia
 1924 - Prichard School (former), 2619 Raceview Dr, Ona, West Virginia
 1925 - Thomas H. Cooper House, 909 Edgewood Rd, Bluefield, West Virginia
 1925 - Russell F. Ritz House, 908 Edgewood Rd, Bluefield, West Virginia
 1925 - Memorial School, 319 Memorial Ave, Bluefield, West Virginia
 1926 - National Armature and Electric Building, 2 Pine St, Bluefield, West Virginia

Alex. B. Mahood, 1926-1970
 1926 - Edgar S. Pedigo House, 105 Oakhurst Ave, Bluefield, West Virginia
 1926 - John T. Wilson House, 404 Oakhurst Ave, Bluefield, West Virginia
 1928 - Arthur Kingdon House, 618 Mountain View Ave, Bluefield, West Virginia
 1929 - Perry Building, 525 Bland St, Bluefield, West Virginia
 1930 - Mercer County Courthouse, 1501 Main St, Princeton, West Virginia
 Listed on the National Register of Historic Places in 1980.
 1934 - U. S. Post Office (former), 400 Neville St, Beckley, West Virginia
 In association with Samuel H. Bridge, a Beckley architect.
 1937 - Mahood Hall, Bluefield State College, Bluefield, West Virginia
 Built as a dormitory, now the College of Business.
 1938 - Edward S. Maclin Hall, West Virginia Institute of Technology, Montgomery, West Virginia
 1938 - Wendell G. Hardway Library, Bluefield State College, Bluefield, West Virginia
 1939 - John Baker White Hall, Concord University, Athens, West Virginia
 Demolished in 2004.
 1941 - Conley Hall, West Virginia Institute of Technology, Montgomery, West Virginia
 1947 - Norfolk and Western Division Office Building, 800 Princeton Ave, Bluefield, West Virginia
 1949 - Scott Street Garage, Scott St, Bluefield, West Virginia
 Demolished.
 1950 - Geriatrics Building, Weston State Hospital, Weston, West Virginia
 1950 - Guyan Theatre (former), 204 Main St, Logan, West Virginia
 1952 - Stoco High School (former), 1868 Tingler Ave, Coal City, West Virginia
 Partially demolished.
 1955 - Princeton High School (former), 300 N Johnston St, Princeton, West Virginia
 1956 - Arnold Hall, West Virginia University, Morgantown, West Virginia
 1958 - Parish House for Christ Episcopal Church, 200 Duhring St, Bluefield, West Virginia
 1962 - Student Center, Concord University, Athens, West Virginia
 1963 - Boreman Hall North, West Virginia University, Morgantown, West Virginia
 1964 - Creative Arts Center, West Virginia University, Morgantown, West Virginia
 1964 - Wilson and Wooddell Halls, Concord University, Athens, West Virginia
 1966 - Brooke and Braxton Towers, West Virginia University, Morgantown, West Virginia
 1967 - Main Building, West Virginia University at Parkersburg, Parkersburg, West Virginia

References

1888 births
1970 deaths
People from Bluefield, West Virginia
20th-century American architects
Architects from West Virginia
Georgian Revival architecture in West Virginia
People from Lynchburg, Virginia
Architects from Virginia
American alumni of the École des Beaux-Arts